Neha Kirpal is the founder of the India Art Fair in 2008. She sold her interest in the Fair after ten years.

Life
Kirpal was born in New Delhi and that was where she spent her childhood. She went to school at the Sardar Patel Vidyalaya before studying Political Science at the Lady Shri Ram College which is also in her home city. Whilst she was at school and university she was the representative at SPIC MACAY (Society for the Promotion of Indian Classical Music And Culture Amongst Youth). She gained a degree and moved to London to study marketing. She enrolled at the University of the Arts London and obtained a masters degree.

In 2008 she started what was then called the India Art Summit which developed into an annual event titled the India Art Fair. The event is well known outside India as a leader in contemporary art.

On International Woman's Day in 2015 she received the Nari Shakti Puraskar. She was one of the first eight Nari Shakti Awards for her leadership and achievement the year before. The award was made on International Women's Day from the then Indian President Pranab Mukherjee.

Kirpal is a consultant and she served on Federation of Indian Chambers of Commerce & Industry "National Advisory Committee for Art".

After ten years of running the India Art Fair she sold her remaining interest to MCH Basel. Since then she has taken an interest in mental health.

Awards
Kirpal has been listed in Forbes "40 under 40" and amongst India's "Most Powerful Women" according to "Business Today" for three years running.

References

Living people
People from New Delhi
Businesspeople from Delhi
Lady Shri Ram College alumni
Year of birth missing (living people)